Anastasios Metaxas (27 February 1862 – 28 January 1937) was a Greek architect and shooter.

Biography
Metaxas was the royal architect of George I of Greece and is best known for being the architect chosen by George Averoff to restore also the Panathinaiko Stadium for the 1896 Summer Olympics in Athens, the birth of the modern Olympic movement, while the design was from Ernst Ziller. He studied architecture at University of Dresden and passed with honours, in his time he would also expand or reform many historic buildings including the Benaki Museum and the National Archaeological Museum, Athens to name a couple. Other works of his include the design for St Andrew's Cathedral, Patras and various public buildings and mansions in Athens.

Metaxas was also an avid shooter and would appear in four Summer Olympics and win two medals, he firstly competed in the 1896 Summer Olympics in the stadium he helped restore, he entered the 200 metre military rifle and the 300 metre free rifle, three positions and he would end up finishing in fourth place in both events.

Ten years later, Metaxas was competing at the 1906 Intercalated Games, where he competed in nine events, with his best result being a silver medal in the Trap, double shot at 14 metres. Two years later Metaxas won a bronze medal in the trap shooting event at the 1908 Summer Olympics, held in London, tying for third place with British shooter Alexander Maunder, with 57 of 80 targets hit.

In 1912, aged 50, Metaxas made his final Olympic appearance at the 1912 Summer Olympics in Stockholm, Sweden, where he finished sixth in the trap competition and 35th in the 30 metre rapid fire pistol event.

Metaxas would later turn to politics as a member of the People's Party.

Architectural works

References

External links

1862 births
1937 deaths
Politicians from Athens
Anastasios
Greek MPs 1935–1936
Members of the Greek Senate
Greek male sport shooters
ISSF rifle shooters
Architects from Athens
Olympic shooters of Greece
Shooters at the 1896 Summer Olympics
Shooters at the 1906 Intercalated Games
Shooters at the 1908 Summer Olympics
Shooters at the 1912 Summer Olympics
Olympic silver medalists for Greece
Olympic bronze medalists for Greece
Olympic medalists in shooting
Medalists at the 1906 Intercalated Games
Medalists at the 1908 Summer Olympics
Sportspeople from Athens
19th-century Greek architects
20th-century Greek architects